Te Fare (French: La Maison - English: The House)  is an 1892 oil on canvas landscape painting by the French post-impressionist artist Paul Gauguin.

The work was created during the artist's initial eighteen-month stay on the island of Tahiti during a period of his opus which has been described as  "exuberant".

The painting was purchased in a private sale in 2008 by the Russian billionaire Dmitry Rybolovlev. The oligarch obtained it for 54 million euros (then $85 million). Then in 2017 he sustained an amore than sixty million dollar loss on his investment when he sold it at auction for $25 million US.

See also
 List of most expensive paintings

References

1892 paintings
Paintings by Paul Gauguin